Ghias Uddin Khan is a Pakistani businessman and entrepreneur who is the 4th and current President and Chief Executive Officer of Engro Corporation.

Education
Khan received his early education in Karachi, Pakistan. He completed his O-Level from St. Michael's Convent School and A-Level from St Patrick's High School, Karachi.

Khan earned a Masters of Business Administration (Hons) in Finance from the Institute of Business Administration in December 1998.

Career
Khan began his career with Intel Pakistan Corporation as Management Associate. He then joined Indosuez W. I. I. Carr Securities, as a financial consultant in 1999 where for worked for a year and a half.

In 2001, Khan co-founded Inbox Business Technologies Private Limited and later served as its CEO. The company Inbox grew from a small computer assembler to one of Pakistan's largest technology company. He joined Dawood Hercules Corporation Limited in 2005 after Dawood Hercules acquired a 51 percent stake in Inbox. He remained associated with the Inbox until 2015. 

He became Chairman of Elixir Securities in 2011 where he served until 2014. From April 2014 to March 2017, he served as a Non Executive Director of Cyan Limited.

He joined the Board of Engro Corporation Limited in 2015 and served as its Director from February 2016 to March 2017.
 
He served as a Director of Dawood Lawrencepur Limited from November 2015 to January 2017.

Khan became 4th Chief Executive Officer and President of Engro Corporation Limited in December 2016.

He served as a Non-Executive Director of Engro Foods Limited from December 2016 to April 2018.

In December 2016, he was appointed as a Director of Engro Polymer and Chemicals Limited and Engro Fertilizers Limited. In March 2017, he became Chairman of Engro Polymer and Chemicals Limited.

He served as a Director of Engro Powergen Qadirpur Limited until March 2017, and also served as a Director of Sindh Engro Coal Mining Company and Jupiter Marine Services.

Under Khan's leadership, all subsidiaries of Engro Coportation saw business growth.

References

Pakistani business executives
Institute of Business Administration, Karachi alumni
Dawood Hercules Corporation
Year of birth missing (living people)
Living people
St. Patrick's High School, Karachi alumni
Engro Corporation